Lucille Rehm is an American politician serving in the Minnesota House of Representatives since 2023. A member of the Minnesota Democratic-Farmer-Labor Party (DFL), Rehm represents District 48B in the western Twin Cities metropolitan area, which includes the city of Chanhassen and Chaska and parts of Carver County in Minnesota.

Early life, education and career 
Rehm received her bachelor's degree in English from the College of St. Benedict, and attended the University of Minnesota, studying the Japanese Language and ESL. She has also studied French at the College International De Cannes, and Japanese at the Sapporo Institute of Language.

Rehm served on the Chanhassen City Council and the Chanhassen Environmental Commission prior to her election to the legislature.

Minnesota House of Representatives 
Rehm was first elected to the Minnesota House of Representatives in 2022, defeating Republican incumbent Greg Boe. Rehm serves on the Agriculture Finance and Policy, Climate and Energy Finance and Policy, Education Finance, and Sustainable Infrastructure Policy Committees.

Electoral history

Personal life 
Rehm lives in Chanhassen, Minnesota with her spouse, Phil, and has three children.

References

External links 

Living people
21st-century American politicians
21st-century American women politicians
Democratic Party members of the Minnesota House of Representatives
College of Saint Benedict and Saint John's University alumni
University of Minnesota alumni
Minnesota city council members
People from Chanhassen, Minnesota